Jānis Porziņģis (born 13 July 1982) is a Latvian former professional basketball player. He is the older brother of Washington Wizards forward Kristaps Porziņģis.

Professional playing career
Porziņģis played for fifteen different teams, in multiple European national domestic leagues over a fourteen-year career. He officially retired from playing professional basketball in 2015, after having last played in 2013.

National team career
Porziņģis also made a few appearances with the senior Latvian national team.

Post playing career
After he retired from playing professional basketball, Porziņģis became an agent for his younger brother, Kristaps Porziņģis, who is also a professional basketball player for the Washington Wizards of the National Basketball Association (NBA).

References

External links
Eurobasket.com Profile
EuroCup Profile
Italian League Profile 

1982 births
Living people
Basket Livorno players
BC Neptūnas players
BK Liepājas Lauvas players
BK Valmiera players
BK Ventspils players
GKK Šibenik players
Kapfenberg Bulls players
Latvian expatriate basketball people in Lithuania
Latvian expatriate basketball people in Spain
Latvian men's basketball players
New Basket Brindisi players
Norrköping Dolphins players
Palencia Baloncesto players
Pistoia Basket 2000 players
Roseto Sharks players
Small forwards
Soproni KC players
Sportspeople from Liepāja
Vanoli Cremona players